A Gospel Journey is a live DVD released by the country/gospel group The Oak Ridge Boys consisting of live performance of various gospel-themed songs from their recording catalog over the years, as well as historical footage and interviews with the group. A CD containing the musical performances was also produced. Both were released on April 21, 2009.

Track listing

 "Jesus Is Coming Soon" (R. E. Winsett, Winsett)  – 2:19
 "I Know" (Burns, Mann, Rouse, Rouse, Tripp)  – 3:27
 "Didn't It Rain" (Emerson, Emerson)  – 4:01
 "Thank God for Kids" (Raven)  – 2:57
 "Elvira" (Frazier)  – 3:31
 "The Baptism of Jesse Taylor" (Frazier, Schafer, Shafer)  – 4:08
 "Jesus Is the Man (For the Hour)" (Hall)  – 2:19
 "Because He Lives" (Gaither, Gaither)  – 3:42
 "Did I Make a Difference" (Anderson, Crosby)  – 3:42
 "Jonah, Job and Moses" (Anderson, Sillers, Sillers)  – 4:06
 "An American Family" (Corbin)  – 3:56
 "Closer to Home" (Tirro, Wood)  – 3:31
 "Live with Jesus" (Kennerley)  – 3:18
 "Loving God, Loving Each Other" (Gaither, Gaither)  – 3:15
 "Where the Soul Never Dies" (Golden)  – 2:55
 "Just a Little Talk with Jesus" (Derricks)  – 2:12

Awards

A Gospel Journey won a Dove Award for Long Form Music Video of the Year at the 41st GMA Dove Awards.

Chart performance

References

External links
A Gospel Journey at Amazon.com

2009 albums
The Oak Ridge Boys albums